Up Idol is a Chinese celebrity reality show broadcast on Hunan Television. The first season debuted on 1 August 2015 with 12 episodes featuring two captains and ten popular celebrities as they travel to different places and experience the Chinese culture. The program was relaunched in 2016. The Chinese title was changed to We are Coming though the official English title remains unchanged as Up Idol. The second season debuted on 22 July 2016 with 12 episodes. The third season debuted on 4 August 2017 with 12 episodes.

Participants

Season 1

Season 2

Season 3

Captains and idol members

Non-idol members

Episodes

Season 1

Season 2

Season 3

Ratings

Season 1 

|-
| OP
| 
| 2.318
| 
| 1
| 
| 9.78
| 1
|-
| 1
| 
| 2.392
| 11.05
| 1
| 2.26
| 12.66
| 1
|-
| 2
| 
| 2.123
| 9.79
| 2
| 1.95
| 11.35
| 1
|-
| 3
| 
| 2.079
| 9.54
| 2
| 1.78
| 10.04
| 1
|-
| 4
| 
| 2.041
| 9.38
| 2
| 2.14
| 12.14
| 1
|-
| 5
| 
| 
| 
| 2
| 2.23
| 
| 1
|-
| 6
| 
| 1.8
| 8.85
| 4
| 1.49
| 9.9
| 1
|-
| 7
| 
| 2.132
| 10.40
| 2
| 1.73
| 11.28
| 1
|-
| 8
| 
| 1.840
| 9.85
| 3
| 1.57
| 11.8
| 1
|-
| 9
| 
| 
| 7.75
| 3
| 
| 
| 1
|-
| 10
| 
| 2.013
| 10.11
| 2
| 1.56
| 10.86
| 1
|-
| 11
| 
| 1.897
| 9.33
| 3
| 1.46
| 10.42
| 1
|-
| 12
| 
| 1.803
| 9.50
| 3
| 1.48
| 10.87
| 1

Season 2 

|-
| 1
| 
| 1.535
| 
| 3
| 
| 
| 1
|-
| 2
| 
| 1.234
| 3.82
| 4
| 1.46
| 4.80
| 1
|-
| 3
| 
| 1.470
| 4.51
| 3
| 1.88
| 5.96
| 1
|-
| 4
| 
| 1.292
| 3.80
| 3
| 1.42
| 4.49
| 1
|-
| 5
| 
| 1.299
| 3.70
| 3
| 1.68
| 5.18
| 1
|-
| 6
| 
| 1.379
| 4.12
| 3
| 1.71
| 5.25
| 1
|-
| 7
| 
| 1.320
| 3.92
| 3
| 1.51
| 4.68
| 1
|-
| 8
| 
| 1.365
| 4.23
| 3
| 1.59
| 5.02
| 1
|-
| 9
| 
| 1.431
| 4.30
| 3
| 1.56
| 4.93
| 1
|-
| 10
| 
| 1.311
| 3.97
| 3
| 1.41
| 4.59
| 1
|-
| 11
| 
| 
| 4.61
| 3
| 1.86
| 5.73
| 1
|-
| 12
| 
| 
| 
| 4
| 
| 
| 1

Season 3 

|-
| 1
| 
| 1.038
| 3.47
| 4
| 1.34
| 4.84
| 1
|-
| 2
| 
| 0.807
| 2.72
| 4
| 0.99
| 3.52
| 1
|-
| 3
| 
| 
| 
| 3
| 
| 
| 1
|-
| 4
| 
| 1.127
| 3.84
| 4
| 1.1
| —
| 1
|-
| 5
| 
| 0.982
| 3.14
| 4
| 0.96
| 
| 1
|-
| 6
| 
| 0.919
| 3.09
| 4
| 1.09
| 3.85
| 1
|-
| 7
| 
| 0.769
| 2.65
| 6
| 1.13
| 3.97
| 1
|-
| 8
| 
| 0.769
| 2.58
| 5
| —
| —
| —
|-
| 9
| 
| 
| 
| 7
| —
| —
| —
|-
| 10
| 
| 0.792
| 2.70
| 3
| 1.07
| 3.79
| 1
|-
| 11
| 
| 0.800
| 2.74
| 3
| 1.1
| 4.04
| 1
|-
| 12
| 
| 0.698
| 2.41
| 4
| 
| —
| 1

Broadcast TV stations 
Start on July 29, 2016, Astro Quan Jia HD air Up Idol simultaneously broadcast with Hunan Television on Fridays 19:50.

References

External links 
 
 Up Idol (season 1) on Mango TV
 Up Idol (season 2) on Mango TV
 Up Idol (season 3) on Mango TV

Hunan Television original programming
Chinese reality television series
2015 Chinese television series debuts